The Baku Museum of Miniature Books is the only museum of miniature books in the world, settled in the old part of Baku, called Inner City. The museum started its operation on April 2, 2002. In 2015 the Museum of Miniature Books was presented the Certificate of the Guinness Book of Records as the largest private museum of miniature books.

Founder
Exhibits in the museum were collected by Zarifa Salahova (the sister of Tahir Salahov) over a period of 30 years. Her collection consists of more than 6500 books from 64 different countries. The museum was opened to public viewing with the hope of promoting childhood literacy.

Characteristics of the museum
The collection contains miniature books published in post-revolutionary Russia and in the Soviet period.

There are books in the exposition from several countries including Moldavia, Georgia, Ukraine, Belarus and from the republics of Middle Asia and Europe. There are many rare editions including those of Chukovsky, Barto, Gogol, Dostoyevsky, and works of A.S.Pushkin. Miniature books of the famous Azerbaijani classics, such as Vagif, Khurshidbanu Natavan, Nizami Ganjavi, Nasimi, Fizuli, Samed Vurgun, Mirza Fatali Akhundov and others are exhibited in the museum.

Other notable miniatures in this collection include a 17th-century copy of the Quran, a 13th-century book published by Peter Schöffer (successor to Johannes Gutenberg).

Visitors can also see rare ancient religious books in the museum aged over 100 years. The most ancient book is the Koran which was published in Saudi Arabia in 1672. Furthermore, there is a miniature book which consists of the songs of the Beatles. New publications are regularly added to the collection in the museum.

The museum consists of 15 sections such as "International", "Baltic countries", "Smallest", "Azerbaijani authors", "Soviet era", "Oldest", "Children's", "Pushkin", "Central Asia", etc. There are 25 glazed exhibition cases in the museum.

Most of the books in the Azerbaijan section are about the country's present and former presidents. There are also miniature books dedicated to the life of former USA president Barack Obama and Turkish nationalist leader Mustafa Kemal Atatürk.

This category also includes the books about the visits of heads of different states to Azerbaijan. As well as miniature books for children in Azerbaijani language are also exhibited in the museum. The museum also has a separate section on Russian literature.

The category of Pushkin, one of the outstanding Russian poets who lived in the 19th century includes 320 books about him and his works. The most famous of them are Eugene Onegin (1837), The Queen of Spades, Stories of Belkin, The biography of my Lermontov, as well as very small book of poems of Pushkin dedicated to Moscow.

Sizes of the books 
The museum has several thousands of the fairy-sized books: macro-mini, miniature, micro-mini and ultra-mini micro.

The world's three smallest books with size of 2mm x 2mm each that can only be read with the use of a magnifying glass which were published by "Toppan Publishing House" are also exhibited in the Baku Museum of Miniature Books: The language of flowers, Birthstone, and The signs of the Zodiac. These books were published in 1978 in Tokyo.

"The most miraculous thing" is the only book in the museum includes into the category containing miniature book with size of 6mm x 9mm. The book is published in Moscow in 1985. The book contains the Máxim Gorki's and Pushkin's works. It has been translated into 4 languages: Italian, German, French and English.

Branches 
The museum has 3 branches, each of which began their activities on the personal initiative of Zarifa Salahova. They are located in Shaki, Nakhchivan and Ganja.

On December 18, 2014, Nakhchivan branch of Miniature Book Museum was opened in the library named after Mammad Said Ordubadi. The branch includes 1000 copies originally brought from Baku.

Ganja Branch of Museum of Miniature Books was opened on May 21, 2016. There are more than 1045 copies of miniature books published in various countries. The exposition also includes books in Russian, Turkish, English, German, Arabic, Georgian and other languages.

In 2017, the Shaki branch of the Museum began its operation. There are 620 miniature books published in 26 countries in 6 showcases.

Exhibitions 
The miniature books of the museum were exhibited in Kabul (1988), in Istanbul (1991), Haifa (1994), in China (1995), in Moscow (1997 and 2003), in Kyiv and Sydney (2000), in Mainz (2003), in Ankara (2005), in Paris (1999 and 2006), in Saudi Arabia (2007), in London and Minsk (2009), in Shanghai (2010), and in Beijing and Havana (2011).

Exposition of the museum

References

External links

 Baku's Miniature Book Museum: Great Ideas in Small Packages, in Azerbaijan International, Vol. 11:2 (Summer 2003), p. 43.

Literary museums in Azerbaijan
Art museums in Baku
Azerbaijani literature